William Catton (1865 – 14 April 1939) was a South African cricketer. He played in two first-class matches for Eastern Province in 1889/90 and 1890/91.

See also
 List of Eastern Province representative cricketers

References

External links
 

1865 births
1939 deaths
South African cricketers
Eastern Province cricketers
Cricketers from Greater London